Gibson Spur is a high rocky spur just west of the mouth of Webb Glacier, in Victoria Land.  Named by the Victoria University of Wellington Antarctic Expedition (VUWAE) (1959–60) after G.W. Gibson, one of the party's geologists.

References

Mountains of Victoria Land
Scott Coast